ʿAwn ibn Jaʿfar was a companion and relative of Muhammad.

He was born in Abyssinia, the third son of Ja'far ibn Abi Talib and Asma bint Umais. The family returned to Medina in 628.

He married his cousin, Umm Kulthum bint Ali, who was a granddaughter of Muhammad. They had no children.

References

Companions of the Prophet